{{Automatic taxobox
| image = Halosphaera viridis.jpg
| image_caption = 'Halosphaera viridis| taxon = Halosphaera
| authority = Schmitz 1879
| subdivision_ranks = Species
| subdivision = 
 H. minor Ostenfeld
 H. ovata Schütt
 H. parkeae Boalch & Mommaerts
 H. russellii Parke
 H. viridis Schmitz 1878
}}Halosphaera'' is a genus of green algae in the order Pyramimonadales.

References

External links

Chlorophyta genera
Pyramimonadophyceae